Champapuri is a village in Bhagalpur district in the Indian state of Bihar. It is the site of the ancient city of Champa, the capital of the Anga mahajanapada.

Champapuri is claimed to be the only place where all the five kalyanas- garbha, janma, diksha, kevalagnana and moksha kalyana of Bhagwan Vasupujya took place. It is said that Bhagawan Adinatha, Bhagwan Parshwanatha and Bhagawan Mahavira had their monsoon stay at this place. Bhagawan Mahavira had his third and twelfth monsoon stay at this place.  There is an idol of Bhagavan at the temple.

Many Jain ascetics like Muni Dharmaghosh, Muni Padmarath, Ashok and Anchal attained salvation at this place. This place being a Siddhakshetra many ascetics like Anchal,Ashok and Padamrath attained salvation at this place. An ancient temple of Champanala is seen at this place.

Significance

Champapuri is also believed to be birthplace of Vasupujya, the twelfth tirthankara.

Many Jain ascetics, like Muni Dharmaghosh, Muni Padmarath, Ashok and Anchal, attained salvation there, as it was a Siddhakshetra An ancient temple of Champanala is seen at this place.

According to Aupapatika Sutra 2-5, a holy garden Purnabhadra Chaitya was situated to the north-east of this ancient city. When Mahavira visited Champa he is said to have lodged at this chaitya.

Archaeology
The ancient city had an occupation of the Northern Black Polished Ware culture (700-200 BCE), with a surrounding fortification and moat. It was a notable centre of trade and commerce.

Statue Of Vasupujya

In 2014, the tallest statue of Bhagawan Vasupujya was built and donated by Smt Sona Devi Sethi Charitable Trust based at Dimapur, Nagaland. The statue is 31 feet in height and the stone for the statue was brought all the way for Karnataka.

References

Citation

Sources 

 
 
  
 
 
 
 
 

Jain temples in Bihar
Ancient Indian cities
5th-century BC Jain temples
Indo-Aryan archaeological sites